The 2020 Armed Forces Bowl may refer to:

 2020 Armed Forces Bowl (January) – a bowl game following the 2019 season, played between Tulane and Southern Miss on January 4, 2020
 2020 Armed Forces Bowl (December) – a bowl game following the 2020 season, played between Tulsa and Mississippi State on December 31, 2020